The 2022 Conference Carolinas men's volleyball tournament is the men's volleyball tournament for Conference Carolinas during the 2022 NCAA Division I & II men's volleyball season. It will be held April 13 through April 23, 2022. First Round and Quarterfinal matches will be held at campus sites while the semifinals and championship will be held at Kornegay Arena in Mount Olive, North Carolina. The winner receives the conference's automatic bid to the 2022 NCAA Volleyball Tournament.

Seeds
All 8 teams are eligible for the postseason. A bye system is used awarding higher seeds byes to the quarter and semifinals. Teams are seeded by record within the conference, with a tiebreaker system to seed teams with identical conference records.

Schedule and results

Bracket

All–Tournament Team
To be filled in upon completion of the tournament.

References

2022 Conference Carolinas men's volleyball season
Volleyball competitions in the United States